Hélène Koscielniak is a Franco-Ontarian educator and writer.

Born in Fauquier, she received a degree in Organizational Studies (Faculty of Education) from the University of Ottawa. She worked in the field of education. Now retired, she lives in Kapuskasing.

She served on the board of governors for Science North and on the Comité consultatif de langue française for TFO.

Selected works 
 Marraine (2007), received the Prix Littérature éclairée du Nord in 2009, finalist for the Prix des lecteurs de Radio-Canada in 2008, finalist for the Prix Christine-Dumitriu-van-Saanen in 2007
 Carnet de bord (2009), received the Prix Littérature éclairée du Nord in 2010
 Contrepoids (2011), received the Prix littérature éclairée du Nord in 2012
 Filleul (2012), received the Prix littérature éclairée du Nord in 2013, finalist for the Prix des lecteurs de Radio-Canada in 2013

References 

Year of birth missing (living people)
Living people
Canadian novelists in French
Franco-Ontarian people
Canadian women novelists
21st-century Canadian novelists
University of Ottawa alumni
Writers from Ontario
People from Cochrane District
21st-century Canadian women writers